The Rock Pool at Westward Ho!, Bideford, Devon is a sea-water tidal swimming pool.

History
Among the rocks on the southern end of Westward Ho! beach, this pool has been in existence for at least 120 years and was renovated in 2003. Depending on the tide, it can be murky.

Description
The sea-pool is managed by Torridge District Council. The pool was closed in 2014 due to lack of funds to repair damage caused by storms, but will re-open after receiving support from the Coastal Communities Fund.

References

External links
 Lidos in the UK

Rock Pool